Spazzacamini (Italian for chimney sweep) was the term for child laborers in 19th- and early 20th-century Italy and Switzerland, where they were also known as Kaminfegerkinder in German-speaking areas.

History and origin 
Most of the boys, usually 8 to 12 years old, were from the canton of Ticino, coveted by their padroni chimney sweepers because they were small and slim and therefore able to climb the narrow chimneys and to clean them. When the boys had reached the top of the chimneys, they had to shout "Spazzacamini!" to prove that they actually had climbed up the dark, stuffy fireplaces. The working conditions were catastrophic. For lunch, the children often had nothing to eat and had to go begging for bread, and they had often to sleep in stables. The boys were hired in the winter, so at the family tables in the badly developed valleys of Ticino one mouth less had to be fed. At that time, bitter poverty and hunger was widely spread in Ticino during the winter months. Many children came from the Valle Verzasca, the Cento Valli and also from the Italian Val Vigezzo valleys, and frequently worked in northern Italy.

In culture 
Every autumn in Vigezzo chimney sweeps from all over the world meet in memory of the chimney sweep child slaves. The children's book Die schwarzen Brüder (the black brothers) was first published in two volumes in 1940–41. The story of Giorgio, a little boy from Sonogno in the Verzasca Valley who had been used as Kaminfegerjunge, is based on facts. Lisa Tetzner had read in ancient chronicles about the fate of such small boys from the Verzasca Valley and other valleys of the Ticino. The book is very popular and, amongst others, a film, a television serial, a musical and a radio play have been based on the novel, as well as naming a hiking route starting in Sonogno in the Verzasca Valley.

Literature 
 Elisabeth Wenger: Als lebender Besen im Kamin: Einer vergessenen Vergangenheit auf der Spur. Books on demand, 2010.
 Lisa Tetzner and Kurt Kläber: Die Schwarzen Brüder. Erlebnisse und Abenteuer eines kleinen Tessiners. First published in 1940–41, Sauerländer, Aarau/Mannheim 2010, .
 Lisa Tetzner and Hannes Binder (illustrations): Die Schwarzen Brüder – Roman in Bildern. Patmos Verlagshaus, Düsseldorf 2002, .

See also 
 Child labour in Switzerland
 Die schwarzen Brüder
 Kinder der Landstrasse
 Verdingkinder
 Wiedergutmachungsinitiative

References

External links 

 
 Museo dello Spazzacamino in Vigezzo  

Society of Switzerland
Child labour in Switzerland
Youth in Switzerland
Slavery in Europe
19th century in Switzerland
Chimney sweeps